Baek Jong-won (born September 4, 1966), sometimes spelled Paik Jong-won, is a South Korean chef. He is the main host of the SBS' cooking television series Baek Jong-won's Top 3 Chef King, Baek Jong-won's Food Truck, and Baek Jong-won's Alley Restaurant.

Personal life
Baek Jong-won was born on September 4, 1966, in Yesan, Chungnam, South Korea. He was interested in food since he was a child. When he was an elementary school student, he was given some biscuits, but he had to fry them with butter and sprinkle them with sugar. He claims his father was also a picky eater, which made him more interested in cooking. When he was a student, his father would buy ten hamburgers at a time on his way home after a business trip. Baek Jong-won would try different recipes to make the hamburgers taste better. It was from then that he started to cook.

Baek married actress So Yoo-jin on January 19, 2013. Their first child, a son, was born on April 9, 2014. Their second child, a daughter, was born on September 21, 2015. Their third child, a daughter, was born on February 8, 2018.

Career
Baek has hosted a number of cooking television shows, including Baek Jong-won's Top 3 Chef King, Baek Jong-won's Food Truck, and Baek Jong-won's Alley Restaurant. In 2021, he produced his own original series, titled Baek Spirit, with Netflix.

He is also the CEO of Theborn Korea Inc, 26 restaurant franchises with 1,299 branches across the country including Saemaul Sikdang, Baek's Coffee and Baek's Bibim.

Filmography

Television shows

Books
He has published many books, usually on cooking or restaurant management.
 2004 There is a Restaurant Secret to Earning Money (돈 버는 식당 비법은 있다), 
 2009 Baek Jong-won's Secret Cooking Recipes (백종원의 식당 조리비책), 
 2010 Professional Restaurant Managing for Beginners (초짜도 대박나는 전문식당), 
 2010 A Restaurant that Always Succeeds (무조건 성공하는 작은식당), 
 2010 Founded Recipes by the Eat-Out Management Professional Baek Jong-Won (외식경영 전문가 백종원의 창업레시피 세트), 
 2013 Beak Jong-won's Meat (백종원의 육), 
 2014 52 Home-cooked Food Recipes Recommended by Baek Jong-won (백종원이 추천하는 집밥 메뉴 52), 
 2016 54 Home-cooked Food Recipes Recommended by Baek Jong-won (백종원이 추천하는 집밥 메뉴 54), 
 2016 Baek Jong-won's Managing Story (백종원의 장사 이야기), 
 2017 55 Home-cooked Food Recipes Recommended by Baek Jong-won (백종원이 추천하는 집밥 메뉴 55),

Awards and nominations

Listicles

References

External links

1966 births
Living people
South Korean television chefs
South Korean chief executives
Businesspeople in the food industry
People from Yesan County
Seoul High School alumni
Yonsei University alumni
Suwon Baek clan
South Korean chefs